Piers Handling is the former CEO and executive director of the Toronto International Film Festival, and former director of the Canadian Film Institute.

Early life
Piers was born to Joan Garrod and Douglas Handling, who met during World War II. He was born in Calgary, but raised on army bases throughout Europe.

Handling studied philosophy at Queen's University, and began his film career at the Canadian Film Institute. He would eventually become director of the CFI.

After leaving the CFI, he taught Canadian cinema at Carleton University in Ottawa and Queen's University in Kingston.

TIFF

Handling joined the Toronto International Film Festival in 1982, replaced Helga Stephenson as programmer in 1987, and became CEO and executive director in 1994.

During his tenure, TIFF became one of the biggest film festivals in the world, with its own permanent downtown home and film hub in TIFF Bell Lightbox, which screens films and holds various events year-round.

In 2003, Handling was named CEO of the Year by the Canadian Public Relations Society. Handling is scheduled to be succeeded by Joana Vicente in November 2018.

Recognition
 Chevalier des Arts et des Lettres, 1997
 Honorary degrees from Ryerson University, York University and OCAD University
 Queen Elizabeth II Diamond Jubilee Medal, 2012
 Clyde Gilmour Award, 2014
 Order of Ontario, 2014
 Order of Canada, 2017

References

External links
 

Canadian film executives
Toronto International Film Festival people
1949 births
Recipients of the Ordre des Arts et des Lettres
Members of the Order of Ontario
Living people
Film festival directors